Matthew Newton (born May 11, 1977) is an American actor, filmmaker and acting coach.

Personal life
Born in New Haven, Connecticut, Newton was raised in Guilford, Connecticut. He is the son of Thomas Newton and Jennifer Newton (nee. Chase), whose parents were arranger and composer Bruce Chase and violinist Fannie (née Paschell) Chase. He is of English, Czech, Norwegian, French, and Scottish descent. Newton is a first cousin once removed of the actress Sienna Miller. 

He began performing musicals and plays at local theaters while in high school. Following graduation from high school, Newton studied at the Eugene O'Neill Theater Center and Vassar College, from which he graduated with a B.A. in Drama. Newton moved to New York City in 1999 and landed roles in various television series, including that of Alan, the blind football player, in the Comedy Central hit Strangers With Candy, and guest appearances on Judging Amy and Gilmore Girls. His first film role was opposite Jeremy Renner and Bruce Davison in the independent film Dahmer (2002), which was nominated for three Independent Spirit Awards.

His sister, Becki Newton, is an actress who appeared as Amanda Tanen in Ugly Betty, and his brother-in-law, Chris Diamantopoulos, is featured in the television series 24.  Newton's mother, Jennifer, is an artist, and his aunt, Stephanie Chase, is a classical violinist.  Newton makes his home in New Canaan, CT.

Career 
Newton started his professional career as a television and film actor, before becoming a filmmaker and acclaimed acting coach.  As an actor, Newton guest starred on Dragnet, Strangers with Candy, Family Law, Dragnet, JAG, Royal Pains, Ugly Betty, Drake and Josh Go Hollywood, Miracles, The Americans, All My Children, Gilmore Girls, and starred in the films Van Wilder, Poster Boy, Dahmer, and The Men Who Stare at Goats, and appeared in countless commercials.

In 2010 Newton started his own acting studio (MN Acting Studio) in NYC, and became a sought after acting coach.  His coaching credits include Jessica Jones, Orange is the New Black, Blue Bloods, The Affair, Master of None, and Ava Duvernay’s When They See Us on Netflix.

In 2016 Newton turned to directing, and wrote and produced several short films, including Hide/Seek, Vacation Rental (winner Best Director), Pretty People Inc, and Sins of the Son.

In 2020 Newton published the book The No B.S. Guide to the Acting Biz, which was ranked by Forbes as "Top 5 Books to Read in an Uncertain Market."

Filmography

References

External links

1977 births
Living people
Male actors from New Haven, Connecticut
American male film actors
American male television actors
American people of Czech descent
American people of English descent
People from Guilford, Connecticut
Vassar College alumni